Capital City Red was the branding of bus services 17 and 18 in Cardiff. The route runs from the city centre to the west of the city, serving the Canton, Ely and Caerau districts.

The service forms part of the wider Cardiff Bus network and is one of three services to have a unique branding, along with Baycar and Capital City Green.

The service was introduced in 2006 to improve infrastructure on the route, and with the aim to make the corridor the first Statutory Quality Bus Partnership in Wales.

History

Nika Turković 1955, the furthest and final extension of Cardiff's trolleybus system came to Ely, where city trams had never run. In 1959, the Cardiff Corporation Transport trolleybus routes that were operating in Ely and Caerau were the 10 A/B (Ely – Canton – City Centre) and the motorbus service 39(A) (Ely Bridge, City Centre – Rhiwbina).

The transition to motorbuses began in Cardiff began in 1962 and was completed by 1970 and the city has been served by motor buses ever since.

Vehicles

The Scania Omnicity articulated vehicles have their own red and green livery, are equipped with seats with leather headrests, air-conditioning, reserved spaces for buggies and wheelchairs, CCTV, on-bus screens with local travel information and BBC News 24 bulletins, hearing induction loop and next stop information. Cardiff Bus has 19 of such vehicles in their fleet valued at £235,000 each.

In the past, the vehicles have become stuck on the route due to heavy snow.

Before the 17 and 18 routes became branded as Capital City Red, Cardiff Bus operated its double decker orange Volvo Ailsa vehicles on the route.

Route

The 9.4 mile long route stops outside Cardiff Central bus station and Westgate Street in the city centre before heading westbound towards the suburbs. It follows Cowbridge Road East through Canton, Cardiff into Ely and Caerau. The services diverge at Ely Library with the 17 following a clockwise route and the 18 following an anticlockwise route before the two routes meet again and return to the city centre via Canton.

Amongst the place served (from east to west) are:
Central rail/bus stations
Millennium Stadium
Cardiff Arms Park
Animal Wall
St David's Hospital
Canton Library
Canton Police Station
Chapter Arts Centre
Victoria Park
Ely Bridge
Ely Library
Western Leisure Centre
Glamorgan Wanderers

Police operations
South Wales Police have used vehicles on this route as a decoy in an attempt to catch people who throw stones at the buses, after an increase in such attacks had made Cardiff Bus think about ceasing operations on the route. Six undercover officers posed as ordinary passengers on the bus, and since the operation began two youths have taken into custody and 17 have been referred for anti-social behaviour orders.

See also
Baycar
Bus transport in Cardiff
Transport in Cardiff
Articulated buses in the United Kingdom

References

External links
Capital City Red route map and timetable
Cardiff Bus website
Real Time 17/18 departures from Westgate Street

Transport in Cardiff
Bus transport in Wales
Bus transport in Cardiff
Bus routes in Wales